"Love Like This" is a song by R&B singer-songwriter Donell Jones. It is the lead single from his sixth album Lyrics. The single had so far peaked at number 44 on the Hot R&B/Hip-Hop Songs chart.

Charts

Weekly charts

Year-end charts

Release information

Purchaseable release

References 

Donell Jones songs
2010 songs
Songs written by Donell Jones
MNRK Music Group singles